Hianga'a Mananga Mbock (born 28 December 1999) is a French professional footballer who plays as a midfielder for  club Caen on loan from Brest.

Professional career
Mbock is a youth product of AS Brestoise, and joined the youth academy of Brest at the age of 13. Mbock debuted with Brest in a 1-1 Coupe de la Ligue tie with FC Metz on 30 October 2019.

On 31 August 2022, Mbock was loaned to Caen for the season.

Personal life
Born in France, Mbock is of Cameroonian and Malagasy descent. Mbock's sister, Griedge Mbock Bathy, is also a professional footballer who represents France internationally.

References

External links
 

1999 births
Living people
Sportspeople from Brest, France
French footballers
French sportspeople of Cameroonian descent
Association football midfielders
Stade Brestois 29 players
Stade Malherbe Caen players
Ligue 1 players
Ligue 2 players
Championnat National 3 players
Footballers from Brittany